The 2014 Three Days of De Panne was the 38th edition of the Three Days of De Panne, an annual bicycle stage race. The race was held in and around the De Panne region of West Flanders. It began in De Panne on 1 April and finished in De Panne on 3 April. As the previous editions, the race consisted of four stages, with two held on the final day. It was part of the 2014 UCI Europe Tour and was rated as a 2.HC event.

Race overview

Teams
A total of 22 teams took part in the race:

ProTeams

 
 
 
 
 
 
 
 
 
 

Professional Continental Teams

 
 
 
 
 
 
 
 
 

Continental Teams

 Team 3M
 
 Veranclassic-Doltcini

Stages

Stage 1
1 April 2014 – De Panne to Zottegem,

Stage 2
2 April 2014 – Zottegem to Koksijde–Oostduinkerke,

Stage 3a
3 April 2014 – De Panne to De Panne,

Stage 3b
3 April 2014 – De Panne to Koksijde to De Panne, individual time trial (ITT)

Classification leadership table

References

External links

Three Days of De Panne
2014 in Belgian sport
Three Days of Bruges–De Panne